William Cunningham  (29 December 184910 June 1919) was a Scottish economic historian and Anglican priest. He was a proponent of the historical method in economics and an opponent of free trade.

Early life and education
Cunningham was born in Edinburgh, Scotland, the third son of James Cunningham, Writer to the Signet. Educated at the Edinburgh Institution (taught by Robert McNair Ferguson, amongst others), the Edinburgh Academy, the University of Edinburgh, and Trinity College, Cambridge, he graduated BA in 1873, having gained first-class honours in the Moral Science tripos.

Career
Cunningham took holy orders in 1873, later serving as chaplain of Trinity College, Cambridge, from 1880 to 1891. He was university lecturer in history from 1884 to 1891, in which year he was appointed Tooke Professor of Economy and Statistics at King's College, London, a post which he held until 1897. He was lecturer in economic history at Harvard University, and Hulsean Lecturer at Cambridge (1885). He became vicar of Great St Mary's, Cambridge, in 1887, and was a founding fellow of the British Academy. In 1907 he was appointed Archdeacon of Ely.

Cunningham's Growth of English Industry and Commerce During the Early and Middle Ages (1890; 4th ed., 1905) and Growth of English Industry and Commerce in Modern Times (1882; 3rd ed., 1903) were at the time among the standard works of reference on the industrial history of England.

Cunningham's eminence as an economic historian gave special importance to his support of Joseph Chamberlain from 1903 onwards in criticizing the English free-trade policies and advocating tariff reform.

He was a critic of the nascent neoclassical economics, particularly as propounded by his colleague, Alfred Marshall, and the Cambridge school.

Cunningham has been described as "a champion of women's education in Cambridge." He taught the British historian Annie Abram.

Cunningham died in 1919 in Cambridge, England.

Works 
 Growth of English Industry and Commerce in Modern Times: The Mercantile System (1882);  Cambridge U. Press, revised 7th ed. (1907) on line, McMaster
 Politics and Economics: An Essay on the Nature of the Principles of Political Economy, Together with a Survey of Recent Legislation, London, Kegan, Paul, Trench & Co. (1885)
 Growth of English Industry and Commerce During the Early and Middle Ages (1890);  Cambridge, 5th ed. (1910) on line, McMaster
   The Use and Abuse of Money, New York, Scribner's (1891); Kessinger, (2006) 
 ;  Routledge (1997)  
 An Essay on Western Civilization in Its Economic Aspects (Ancient Times), Cambridge U. Press (1898)
 An Essay on Western Civilization in Its Economic Aspects (Mediaeval and Modern Times), Cambridge U. Press (1900)
 The Rise and Decline of the Free Trade Movement (1904);  Cosimo 
 Christianity and Politics, Boston and New York, Houghton Mifflin (1915)
 The Story of Cambridgeshire (1920). Cambridge University Press (reissued by Cambridge University Press, 2009)

See also
 Compatriots Club
 National Party (UK, 1917)

References

Footnotes

Bibliography

External links

 

1849 births
1919 deaths
19th-century Scottish Episcopalian priests
19th-century British historians
19th-century British male writers
19th-century British writers
19th-century British economists
20th-century Scottish Episcopalian priests
20th-century British historians
20th-century British male writers
20th-century British economists
Academics of King's College London
Alumni of Trinity College, Cambridge
Alumni of the University of Edinburgh
Anglican scholars
Archdeacons of Ely
Converts to Anglicanism from Presbyterianism
Economic historians
English historical school of economics
Fellows of the British Academy
Fellows of Trinity College, Cambridge
Harvard University staff
People educated at Edinburgh Academy
People educated at Stewart's Melville College
Presidents of the Cambridge Union
Presidents of the Royal Historical Society